Alejandro Gonzalo Vásquez Aguilera (born 5 June 1984) is a Chilean footballer who plays for Deportes Melipilla as a midfielder.

References

External links
 
 

1984 births
Living people
Footballers from Santiago
Chilean footballers
Association football midfielders
Chilean Primera División players
Primera B de Chile players
Segunda División Profesional de Chile players
Colo-Colo footballers
Everton de Viña del Mar footballers
C.D. Antofagasta footballers
Deportes La Serena footballers
Universidad de Concepción footballers
O'Higgins F.C. footballers
Curicó Unido footballers
Ñublense footballers
Cobreloa footballers
Audax Italiano footballers
San Marcos de Arica footballers
Deportes Iberia footballers
Deportes Melipilla footballers
Lautaro de Buin footballers